Édison Hipólito Chará Lucumí (2 October 1980 – 19 October 2011) was a Colombian football striker. His last team was Chinese club Dalian Aerbin.

Career 
Chará began his career with Deportivo Cali and joined in January 2003 to local rival América de Cali. After seventeen games, when scored four goals for América de Cali, was transferred to the Peruvian club Cienciano. The fast striker played one year for Cienciano, where scored nine goals in twenty one games and was scouted from Sporting Cristal on 28 December 2006. Chará played only ten games and scored four goals in the season 2007/2008, was linked with Energie Cottbus and left after of the season his club to sign for Juan Aurich.

Chará moved to China League One club Dalian Aerbin in March 2011  and was released in July 2011.

Death
Chará died at a hospital in Cali on 19 October 2011, after having been shot by hitmen in Puerto Tejada, Cauca.

References

1980 births
2011 deaths
Colombian footballers
Association football forwards
Categoría Primera A players
Uruguayan Primera División players
Peruvian Primera División players
Deportivo Pereira footballers
Deportivo Cali footballers
Atlético Huila footballers
Montevideo Wanderers F.C. players
América de Cali footballers
Once Caldas footballers
Cienciano footballers
Sporting Cristal footballers
Juan Aurich footballers
Unión Comercio footballers
Dalian Professional F.C. players
Colombian expatriate footballers
Expatriate footballers in Uruguay
Expatriate footballers in Peru
Expatriate footballers in China
Deaths by firearm in Colombia
Male murder victims
Colombian murder victims
People murdered in Colombia
Sportspeople from Cauca Department
China League One players